Yathaʾ is a pre-Islamic god worshiped by the Sabaeans and Hemyarites of Yemen. Nine kings have a theophoric name prefixed by Yathaʾ. The name may be an archaic equivalent to יֵ֫שַׁע (yesha – yeh'-shah), which is a masculine noun meaning "salvation." See Strong's Hebrew: 3468 for details.

Savior God. A Hemyaritic deity, to whom, in conjunction with the other local gods, a temple was erected in Abyan by Abd-shams-Aslam and his brother Marthad.  He was the special guardian of the town of Aden, and his analogue was the Chaldean divinity Salman.

References

Arabian gods
Sabaeans
Himyarite Kingdom
Savior gods
Himyarites